Ammonius of Athens, sometimes called Ammonius the Peripatetic, was a philosopher who taught in Athens in the 1st century AD.

He was a teacher of Plutarch, who praises his great learning, and introduces him discoursing on religion and sacred rites. Plutarch wrote a biography of him, which is no longer extant, and also mentioned Ammonius master in other works like the De E apud Delphos within the treaty series Moralia.

From the information supplied by Plutarch, Ammonius was clearly an expert in the works of Aristotle, but he may have nevertheless been a Platonist philosopher rather than a Peripatetic.

He may be the Ammonius of Lamprae (in Attica) quoted by Athenaeus as the author of a book on altars and sacrifices. Athenaeus also mentions a work on Athenian courtesans as written by an Ammonius.

References

1st-century philosophers
Middle Platonists
Roman-era Peripatetic philosophers
Roman-era Athenian philosophers